The following units and commanders fought in the Battle of Ligny 16 June 1815.

French Army

L'Armée du Nord (68,000 men) under the command of Emperor Napoleon I.

Major Général (Chief of staff): Marshal Nicolas Jean de Dieu Soult.

 Imperial guard, commander: Marshal Mortier (absent); aide-major-général (second-in-command): GD Drouot 
Old Guard Division GD Friant
Middle Guard Division, GD Morand
Young Guard Division, GD Duhesme
Heavy Cavalry Division, GD Guyot

* I Corps, commander: GD Drouet d'Erlon (Corps not engaged)
1st Division, GB Quiot
2nd Division, GD Donzelot

 II Corps commander: GD Reille (at Quatre Bras, except:)
7th Infantry Division, GD Girard †

 III Corps commander: GD Vandamme 
8th Infantry Division, GD Lefol 
10th Infantry Division, GD Habert 
11th Infantry Division, GD  Berthezène
3rd Cavalry Division, GD Domon

 IV Corps  Gérard 
12th Infantry Division, GD Pécheux
13th Infantry Division, GD Vichery 
14th Infantry Division, GD Hulot 
Cavalry reserve, GD Jacquinot

 VI Corps, commander: GD Mouton-Lobau (Corps not engaged)
20th Division, GD Jeanin

 Cavalry reserve, commander: Marshal Grouchy
III Cavalry Corps, commander: GD Kellermann (at Quatre Bras, except:)
11th Division,  GD l'Héritier
IV Cavalry Corps, commander: GD Milhaud 
14th Cavalry Division Delort

Prussian Army

Prussian Army (84,000 men), under the command of Field Marshal Gebhard Leberecht von Blücher

Lieutenant-General (Chief of staff): August von Gneisenau

 I Corps, commander:  Lieutenant-General von Zieten
1st Brigade, Major-General von Steinmetz 
2nd Brigade, Major-General Pirch II 
3rd Brigade, Major-General Jagow 
4th Brigade major, general Henckel von Donnersmarck 
Reserve Cavalry, Lieutenant-General von Röder 
1st brigade, von Teskow
2nd brigade, von Lützow
Reserve artillery, von Lehmann

 II Corps, commander: Lieutenant-General von Pirch I 
5th Brigade, Major-General von Tippelskirch 
6th Brigade, Major-General von Krafft 
7th Brigade, Major-General von Brause 
8th Brigade, Major-General Bose 
Reserve Cavalry Major-General of Cavalry, von Wahlen-Jürgass 
1st brigade, von Thümen
2nd brigade, von Schulenburg
3rd brigade, von Sohr
Reserve artillery, von Röhl

 III Corps, Lieutenant-General von Thielmann 
9th brigade, von Borcke
10th Brigade, von Kämpffen 
11th Brigade, von Luck 
12th Brigade, von Stülpnagel
Reserve Cavalry Major-General von Hobe 
1st brigade, von der Marwitz
2nd brigade, von Lottum
Reserve artillery, von Mohnhaupt

See also
 Quatre Bras order of battle
 Order of Battle of the Waterloo Campaign

Notes

References

Further reading
 French Order of battle of Ligny
 Prussian Order of battle of Ligny

Napoleonic Wars orders of battle